Ornithogalum candicans, known as the summer hyacinth, is a species of flowering plant in the family Asparagaceae, native to moist grassland in South Africa (Limpopo, Mpumalanga, Free State, Kwazulu/Natal, Eastern Cape). It is still widely referenced under its synonym Galtonia candicans. Originally it had been designated as Hyacinthus candicans, by Baker in 1870.

This plant has gained the Royal Horticultural Society's Award of Garden Merit.

Cultivation 
Hardiness: Z 7-10

References

Bibliography 

 
 
 
 

candicans
Taxa named by John Gilbert Baker
Taxa named by John Charles Manning
Taxa named by Peter Goldblatt